A kaftan or caftan is a variant of the robe or tunic. Originating in Asia, it has been worn by a number of cultures around the world for thousands of years. In Russian usage, kaftan instead refers to a style of men's long suit with tight sleeves. It may be made of wool, cashmere, silk, or cotton, and may be worn with a sash. Popular during the time of the Ottoman Empire, detailed and elaborately designed garments were given to ambassadors and other important guests at the Topkapı Palace. Variations of the kaftan were inherited by cultures throughout Asia and were worn by individuals in Russia (North Asia, Eastern Europe and formerly Central Asia), Southwest Asia and Northern Africa.

Styles, uses, and names for the kaftan vary from culture to culture. The kaftan is often worn as a coat or as an overdress, usually having long sleeves and reaching to the ankles. In regions with a warm climate, it is worn as a light-weight, loose-fitting garment. In some cultures, the kaftan has served as a symbol of royalty.

History 
According to Encyclopedia of Islam, this fashion came up quite early among Arabs under the influence of Persian fashions. In Arabic, the word khaftān is used just like in Persian. It is described as a long robe as far as the calves sometimes or just under the knee. It is open at the front and the sleeves are slight cut at the wrists or even as far as to the middle of the arms.

D'Arvieux in his travels in the 17th century mentions Syrian Amirs and Bedouin Sheikhs wearing the kaftan as winter garments.

Abbasid era 
During the Islamic golden age of the Abbasid era, the cosmopolitan super-culture spread far and wide to Chinese emperors, Anglo-Saxon coinage, but also in Constantinople too (current day Istanbul). They were mimicking and imitating Baghdadi culture (capital of the Abbasids). 

In the 830s, Emperor Theophilus, who fought the Arabs on the battlefield and built a Baghdad-style palace near the Bosporus, went about à l'arabe in kaftans and turbans. Even as far as the streets of Ghuangzhou during the era of Tang dynasty, the Persian kaftan was in fashion.

The kaftan became a luxurious fashion, a richly styled robe with buttons down the front. The caliphs wore elegant kaftans made from silver or gold brocade and buttons in the front of the sleeves. The caliph al-Muqtaddir (908–932) wore a kaftan from silver brocade Tustari silk and his son one made from Byzantine silk richly decorated or ornamented with figures. The kaftan was spread far and wide by the Abbasids and made known throughout the Arab world.

Turkic kaftan

The caftan appears to be the oldest Turkish dress, this costume can be traced as far back as the Hun and Gokturk periods. The kaftan was the favourite garment worn in Turkic states of Central Asia, the Turkic Empire in India, the Seljuk Turks and the Ottomans. It was the most important component of the Seljuk period and the oldest known examples of this robe are said to have been found in Hun tombs. The costume of the Gokturk period consisted of long kaftans that are closed with a belt at the waist, these kaftans can be observed in Gokturk statues. 

The Seljuk Sultan Ahmad Sanjar who ruled from 1097 to 1118 gave 1000 red kaftans to his soldiers. In 1058 as well as the period of the Seljuk Sultan Malik-Shah I, the Seljuk Turks wore kaftans and excavations discovered a child's kaftan dating back to the reign of Sanjar-Shah who ruled from 1185 or 1186 to 1187.

The tiles in the Kubadabad Palace depict Turkish figures dressed in kaftans. The palace was built for Sultan Aladdin Kayqubad I who ruled from 1220 to 1237. Furthermore, typical Seljuk depictions from the 11th to the 13th century depict figures dressed in Turkish style kaftans. The kaftan was also worn by the Anatolian Seljuks who had even gifted kaftans to the first Ottoman Sultan, Osman I. In connection with the inheritance of Osman I, the historian Neşri described a kaftan in the list of inherited items: “There was a short-sleeved kaftan of Denizli cloth.”

In an excavation in Kinet in Turkey, a bowl dating back to the early 14th century was found with a depiction of a man wearing what appears to be a kaftan.

Kaftans were worn by the sultans of the Ottoman Empire. Decoration on the garment, including colours, patterns, ribbons, and buttons, indicated the rank of the person who wore it. In the first half of the 14th century Orhan Ghazi captured Bursa and made it the Ottoman capital. One of the chief specialties of Bursa was gold embroidery among other weaving related specialties, an archive notes that two kaftans made of the finest Bursa gold-brocaded velvet were prepared for the circumcision of Geliboulu Bey Sinan Pasha’s two sons in 1494.

Ibn Battuta who had visited Anatolia witnessed that a mudarris was wearing a gown embroidered with golden pieces and that a Seljuk Bey gifted a kaftan that was embroidered with golden threads. From the 14th century through the 17th century, textiles with large patterns were used. By the late 16th and early 17th centuries, decorative patterns on the fabrics had become smaller and brighter. By the second half of the 17th century, the most precious kaftans were those with yollu: vertical stripes with varying embroidery and small patterns – the so-called "Selimiye" fabrics.

Most fabrics manufactured in Turkey were made in Istanbul and Bursa, but some textiles came from as far away as Venice, Genoa, Persia (Iran), India, and even China. kaftans were made from velvet, aba, bürümcük (a type of crepe with a silk warp and cotton weft), canfes, çatma (a heavy silk brocade), gezi, diba, hatayi, kutnu, kemha, seraser (brocade fabric with silk warp and gold or silver metallic thread weft), zerbaft, and tafta. Favoured colours were indigo, kermes, violet, pişmiş ayva or "cooked quince", and weld yellow. Silk or wooled vests embellished with couched gold thread or silk embroidery probably represent the introduction of a Turkish feature into an Arab aesthetic.

Nearly 2500 caftans and other garments belonging to subsequent sultans from the 15th to the 19th century are preserved in the Topkapi Saray museum. The Topkapı Palace houses 21 kaftan that belonged to Mehmed II, 77 kaftan that belonged to Suleiman the Magnificent, 13 that belonged to Ahmed I, 30 that belonged to Osman II and 27 that belonged to Murad IV.

Algerian kaftan

The Female kaftan is inscribed in the intangible cultural heritage of humanity, as Tlemcen's costume. It is the main piece of the Chedda of Tlemcen. 

The kaftan has been historically documented to be worn in Algeria in the beginning of the 16th century and the presence of the kaftan in Algeria dates far back to the Rustamid period and is attested during the Zirid period in the 10th century as well as the Zayyanid period. Following the Ottoman tradition, the male kaftan, known as the kaftan of honour, was bestowed by the Ottoman Sultan upon the governors of Algiers who, in turn, bestowed kaftans upon the Beys and members of distinguished families. In his Topography and General History of Algiers,  described it as a coloured robe made of satin, of damask, of velvet and silk and having a form that reminded him of the priests' cassocks. The Dey wore the kaftan with dangling sleeves; the khodjas (secretaries) wore a very long cloth based kaftan, falling to the ankles; the chaouchs (executors of the justice of the dey) were recognized by a green kaftan with sleeves either open or closed, according to their rank. The kaftan was also worn by the janissaries in the 17th and part of the 18th century. It continued to be worn by male dignitaries well into the 20th century.

The introduction of gold thread embroidery into North Africa itself is reputed to have been introduced through Turkish rule.

In 1789, the diplomat Venture de Paradis described the woman of Algiers as follows:

Several types of kaftans were developed since then, while still respecting the original pattern. Nowadays, the Algerian female kaftans, including the modernised versions, are seen as an essential garment in the bride's trousseau in cities such as Algiers, Annaba, Bejaia, Blida, Constantine, Miliana, Nedroma and Tlemcen.

Moroccan kaftan 
According to the Encyclopaedia of Islam, the kaftan was introduced into the Barbary States by the Ottomans and spread by fashion as far as Morocco.

According to art historian Rachida Alaoui, the kaftan in Morocco dates back to the end of the 15th century and goes back to the region's Moorish history, which represents the medieval heritage of Al-Andalus. However, the first written record of the garment being worn in Morocco is from the 16th century, she states.

According to Naima El Khatib Boujibar, however, the kaftan might only have been introduced to Morocco by the Saadi Sultan Abd al-Malik, who had lived in Algiers and Istanbul. Abd al-Malik, who had officially acknowledged Ottoman overlordship throughout his time as ruler of Morocco, dressed in Ottoman fashion, spoke Turkish, reorganised his army and administration in imitation of Ottoman practices and used Ottoman Turkish titles for his officials. The second half of the sixteenth century was a period of Ottoman influence in Morocco during which Ahmad al-Mansur, who was greatly influenced by Ottoman culture, adopted Turkish costumes and customs, he introduced Ottoman fashions of dress, his army adopted Turkish costumes and titles and ambassadors even noted the use of Turkish pottery and Turkish carpets in the Badi Palace. Aspects of Ottoman culture had been introduced to Morocco during the reign of both Abd al-Malik and Ahmad al-Mansur and Abd al-Malik’s brief reign opened a period which continued under his successor of the "Turkification" of Morocco. Henri Terrasse asserted that Moroccan embroidery styles are almost all derived from the former regions of the Turkish empire, the introduction of gold thread embroidery into North Africa itself is reputed to have been introduced with Turkish rule.

Worn by the dignitaries and women of the palace at first, it became fashionable among the middle classes from the late 17th century onwards.

Today in Morocco, kaftans are worn by women of different social groups and the word kaftan is commonly used to mean a "one-piece traditional fancy dress". Alternative two-piece versions of Moroccan kaftans are called takchita and worn with a large belt. The takchita is also known as Mansouria which derives from the name of Sultan Ahmad al-Mansur, who invented Al-Mansouria and the new fashion of wearing a two-piece kaftan.

West African kaftan

In West Africa, a kaftan is a pullover robe, worn by both men and women. The women's robe is called a kaftan, and the men's garment is referred to as a Senegalese kaftan.

A Senegalese kaftan is a pullover men's robe with long bell-like sleeves. In the Wolof language, this robe is called a mbubb and in French, it is called a boubou. The Senegalese kaftan is an ankle-length garment, and is worn with matching drawstring pants called tubay. Usually made of cotton brocade, lace, or synthetic fabrics, these robes are common throughout West Africa. A kaftan and matching pants are called a kaftan suit. The kaftan suit is worn with a kufi cap. Senegalese kaftans are formal wear in all West African countries.

Persian
Persian kaftan robes of honour were commonly known as khalat or kelat.

Russian (North Asia and Eastern Europe) 

In Russia, the word "kaftan" is used for another type of clothing: a style of men's long suit with tight sleeves. Going back to the people of various Baltic, Turkic, Varangian (Vikings) and Iranic (Scythian) tribes who inhabited today's Russia along with the Slavic population, kaftan-like clothing was already prevalent in ancient times in regions where later the Rus' Khaganate and Kievan Rus' states appeared.

The Russian kaftan was probably influenced by Persian and/or Turkic people in Old Russia. The word "kaftan" was adopted from the Tatar language, which in turn borrowed the word from Persia. In the 13th Century, the kaftan was still common in Russia. In the 19th century, Russian kaftans were the most widespread type of outer-clothing amongst peasants and merchants in Old Russia. Currently in the early 21st Century, they are most commonly used as ritual religious clothing by conservative Old Believers, in Russian fashion (Rusfashion), Russian folk dress and with regards to Russian folklore.

Jewish

Hasidic Jewish culture adapted a silky robe (bekishe) or frock coat (kapoteh, Yiddish word kapote or Turkish synonym chalat) from the garb of Polish nobility, which was itself a type of kaftan. The term kapoteh may originate from the Spanish capote or possibly from "kaftan" via Ladino. Sephardic Jews from Muslim countries wore a kaftan similar to those of their neighbours.

Southeast Asian
In Southeast Asia, the kaftan was originally worn by Arab traders, as seen in early lithographs and photographs from the region. Religious communities that formed as Islam became established later adopted this style of dress as a distinguishing feature, under a variety of names deriving from Arabic and Persian such as "jubah", a robe, and "cadar", a veil or chador.

Europe and United States 

In the recent era the kaftan was introduced to the West in the 1890s, Queen Victoria's granddaughter Alix of Hesse wore a traditional Russian coronation dress before a crowd which included Western on-lookers, this traditional dress featured the loose-fitting Russian kaftan which was so exotic to Western eyes. This was one of the first times a Western woman, a high-status Western woman who had also been seen in fashionable Western dress no less, was seen wearing something so exotic. The traditional Russian kaftan resembles the kaftans worn by the Ottoman sultans; it was in stark contrast to the tight-fitting, corseted dresses common in England at that time.

The kaftan slowly gained popularity as an exotic form of loose-fitting clothing. French fashion designer Paul Poiret further popularised this style in the early 20th century.

In the 1950s, fashion designers such as Christian Dior and Balenciaga adopted the kaftan as a loose evening gown or robe in their collections. These variations were usually sashless.

American hippie fashions of the late 1960s and the 1970s often drew inspiration from ethnic styles, including kaftans. These styles were brought to the United States by people who journeyed the so-called "hippie trail". African-styled, kaftan-like dashikis were popular, especially among African-Americans. Street styles were appropriated by fashion designers, who marketed lavish kaftans as hostess gowns for casual at-home entertaining.

Diana Vreeland, Babe Paley, and Barbara Hutton all helped popularise the kaftan in mainstream western fashion. Into the 1970s, Elizabeth Taylor often wore kaftans designed by Thea Porter. In 1975, for her second wedding to Richard Burton she wore a kaftan designed by Gina Fratini.

More recently, in 2011 Jessica Simpson was photographed wearing kaftans during her pregnancy. American fashion editor André Leon Talley has also worn kaftans designed by Ralph Rucci as one of his signature looks. Beyoncé, Uma Thurman, Susan Sarandon, Kate Moss, Mary-Kate and Ashley Olsen, and Nicole Richie have all been seen wearing the style. Some fashion lines have dedicated collections to the kaftan.

Gallery

See also
 Chapan
 Deel (clothing)
 Kanzu
 Kufi
 Ottoman clothing
 Takchita
 Thawb
 Wrapper (clothing)

References

External links 
 

Arab culture
Arabic clothing
History of Asian clothing
Kurdish clothing
Mesopotamia
Moroccan clothing
Ottoman clothing
Robes and cloaks
Russian folk clothing
Uzbekistani culture